The 2014 Port Vila Shield  was the 2nd edition of the Port Vila Shield, which placed the teams from the 2013-14 TVL Premier League against each other in a cup format. This cup acts a sort of warm-up for the second part of the league in the following months. The competition was held at the Port Vila Municipal Stadium.

Teams 
 Amicale F.C.
 Erakor Golden Star
 Ifira Black Bird F.C.
 Shepherds United
 Spirit 08 F.C.
 Tafea F.C.
 Tupuji Imere F.C.
 Yatel F.C.

Playoffs

Quarter-finals

Semi-finals

Third-Place Match

Final

References 

2013–14 in Vanuatuan football